State Road 27 is an IB-class road in western, northern, central and eastern Serbia, connecting Bosnia and Herzegovina at Trbušnica with Svilajnac. It is located in Šumadija and Western Serbia, Belgrade and Southern and Eastern Serbia regions.

Before the new road categorization regulation given in 2013, the route wore the following names: M 14.1, M 19 and M 4 (before 2012) / 23, 21, 13, A2, 16, 150 and 132 (after 2012).

The existing route is a main road with two traffic lanes. By the valid Space Plan of Republic of Serbia the road is not planned for upgrading to motorway, and is expected to be conditioned in its current state.

Section from Ćelije to Lazarevac is a part of European route E763.

Sections

See also 
 Roads in Serbia
 European route E763

References

External links 
 Official website - Roads of Serbia (Putevi Srbije)
 Official website - Corridors of Serbia (Koridori Srbije) (Serbian)

State roads in Serbia